Tim Wilkin (born November 5, 1965) is an American politician in the state of Minnesota. He served in the Minnesota House of Representatives.

References

Republican Party members of the Minnesota House of Representatives
1965 births
Living people